The New Democratic Party fielded a full slate of 308 candidates in the 2006 Canadian federal election. It won 29 seats in the election to remain the fourth-largest party in the House of Commons. Many of the New Democratic Party's candidates have their own biography pages; information about others may be found here.

Newfoundland and Labrador

Avalon: Eugene Conway

Eugene Conway received 3,365 votes (9.07%), finishing third against Conservative candidate, Fabian Manning.

Bonavista—Gander—Grand Falls—Windsor: Sandra Cooze
Sandra Cooze received 2,668 votes (7.0%), finishing third against Liberal incumbent, Scott Simms.

Humber—St. Barbe—Baie Verte: Holly Pike
Holly Pike received 4,847 votes to Liberal incumbent Gerry Byrne's 17,208. She later served as Acting Principal at Grenfell Campus, Memorial University of Newfoundland in Corner Brook.

Labrador: Jacob Edward Larkin
Jacob Edward Larkin received 1,037 votes (9.08%), finishing third to Liberal incumbent, Todd Russell.

Random—Burin—St. George's: Amanda Will
Amanda Will received 3,702 votes (12.34%), finishing third to Liberal incumbent, Bill Matthews.

Quebec
Note: this section is incomplete.

Ontario

Bramalea—Gore—Malton: Cesar Martello

Martello is a student at York University, and a member of the Canadian Federation of Students. He served briefly in the Senate of York University, attending only one meeting (see February 27, 2003). He has also served as director of public relations for his student council.

Martello campaigned as a member of the Ontario New Democratic Party in the 2003 provincial election, in the Greater Toronto Area constituency of Bramalea—Gore—Malton—Springdale. He finished third, with 4,931 votes (11.65%). The winner was Liberal candidate Kuldip Singh Kular.

In the 2004 federal election, Martello ran for the federal NDP in the Toronto riding of Etobicoke North. He again finished third with 3,761 votes (12.24%).

Brampton—Springdale: Anna Mather

Anna Mather graduated in December 2007 with an MSc in Politics and Communication from the London School of Economics and Political Science. Mather also completed a B.A. (with distinction) in Political Science and Sociology at the University of Toronto in 2006. Mather attended a summer course in Shakespeare at Oxford University in 2005.  She was born in Toronto in 1981 and was raised in Brampton, Ontario.

Having previously worked as an intern at the CTV Washington News Bureau, as well as a public relations coordinator at Astral Media for Family, she was recently enlisted as the Media Captain for the ReelHeART International Film Festival in Toronto.

In late 2005, Anna Mather represented the New Democrats (NDP) in a nationally televised debate on the role of women in politics, which was broadcast on CPAC (Toronto Star, 21 December 2005). Her opponents were Liberal leadership candidate Carolyn Bennett represented the Liberal Party, and former Conservative Cabinet Minister Pauline Browes. She also appeared on MuchMusic and CTV to address the role of both youth and women in politics.

Mather's campaign focused on the recognition of foreign credentials. Mather and her team proposed amending the Canadian Human Rights Act to ban hiring discrimination based solely on where candidates got their experience or education.

Mather maintained the party's recent high-water mark for Brampton-Springdale, receiving 8,345 votes (17.72%), against Liberal incumbent Ruby Dhalla.

Mather ran a blog at annamather.ca, for the duration of her campaign, serving as her primary campaign website.

Brampton West: Jagtar Singh Shergill

Born 1970 in Punjab, India, Shergill studied agricultural science at the Punjab Agricultural University. He immigrated to Canada in 1992 to continue studying agriculture at Olds College in Alberta. He moved to Brampton, Ontario in 1999, and began an insurance company in 2000.

Shergill supported Anna Mather's proposal to amend the Canadian Human Rights Act to ban hiring discrimination based solely on where candidates received their experience or education.

Eglinton—Lawrence: Maurganne Mooney

Mooney was born in Pembroke, Ontario, in 1970, and was raised in Ontario and Nova Scotia. At age twelve, she promoted reforms in the Halifax police department. She served as a military member of 723 Halifax Communications Squadron, and provided Radioteletype equipment to Canadian forces during Operation Desert Storm. She is a graduate of George Brown College's Assaulted Women and Children's Counsellor and Advocate program, and works with Aboriginal Legal Services of Toronto. She has also worked as an outreach coordinator for Maggie's, an advocacy group for sex-trade workers, and has advocated the decriminalization of adult prostitution. In addition, Mooney has produced an autobiographical performance art show. She received 5,660 votes (11.49%), finishing third against Liberal incumbent Joe Volpe.

Etobicoke—Lakeshore: Liam McHugh-Russell

Liam McHugh-Russell (born 1980) was a Sauvé Scholar hosted at McGill University, a (J.D.) graduate from the University of Toronto Faculty of Law, and received his degree in math from the University of Waterloo. McHugh-Russell finished third behind Liberal Party of Canada candidate Michael Ignatieff and Conservative Party of Canada candidate John Capobianco.

Kingston and the Islands: Rob Hutchison

Hutchison was born in Belleville, Ontario and was raised near Ottawa (Kingston Whig-Standard, 26 June 2004). He has a Bachelor of Arts degree in English and Philosophy from Queen's University, and a diploma in Social services administration and certificate in Municipal administration from St. Lawrence College.

He is president of the Kingston Community Options Funds and Kingcole Homes Inc., a member of the City of Kingston Not-For-Profit Housing Advisory Group and the Kingston Not-For-Profit Housing Association, and past president of the Kingston Global Community Centre. Hutchison is also a co-founder of Pic Press, a local community newspaper [information from 2004 campaign brochure].

Hutchison campaigned for Kingston's Public Utilities Commission in 1991, and finished sixth in a field of twelve candidates. The top four candidates were declared elected (Kingston Whig-Standard, 13 November 1991). In 1996, he argued before a provincial committee against proposed changes to Ontario's labour laws by the provincial government of Mike Harris (KWS, 29 August 1996). He later campaigned for Kingston City Council in 1997, and lost to Ken Matthews in a close contest in Ward Eight (KWS, 12 November 1997).

He won the NDP nomination in 2004 over retired electrical engineer Bill Fisher and Queen's student Ian Griffiths (KWS, 26 March 2004), and finished third against Liberal incumbent Peter Milliken. He faced Milliken again in the 2006 election, and again finished third. He was 54 years old in 2004.

Municipal results are taken from reports in the Kingston Whig-Standard. The final results were not significantly different. Electors in the 1991 contest could vote for four candidates.

Kitchener—Waterloo: Edwin Laryea
Edwin Laryea was born in Ghana, West Africa. He immigrated to Canada in 1962, settling in the Waterloo area in 1972.

Edwin holds an Honours Bachelor of Arts in French and Spanish from McMaster University in Hamilton, Ontario, a Bachelor of Education in French and Spanish, University of Toronto, Toronto, Ontario and a Masters of Arts in French, University of Toronto, Toronto, Ontario.

Edwin served with the Waterloo Regional School Board for over 30 years as a teacher, vice-principal and principal.

He was the founder and former advisor for Kiwanis Builders, KEY and Circle Clubs, including participation in the University of Waterloo's school-building trip to Kenya in 2005.

Edwin was the New Democratic Party candidate in the 2006 federal election and 2004 federal election

He currently serves as Chair of Waterloo Region Youth Action Committee.

Lanark—Frontenac—Lennox and Addington: Helen Forsey

Forsey is the daughter of Eugene Forsey, the late Canadian Constitutional expert and founding member of the Cooperative Commonwealth Federation (Kingston Whig-Standard, 26 January 2006). She holds a degree in agricultural science from McGill University, and is a writer and activist. She was convicted of trespassing in early 1990 for having protested against logging operations in Temagami, and participated in a peace camp later in the same year in support of native demonstrators in Oka (Montreal Gazette, 22 September 1990),

Forsey opposed the first Gulf War in 1990–91 (KWS, 13 December 1990), and wrote against the Charlottetown Accord in 1992 (KWS, 22 October 1992). She has defended her father's constitutional views, and argues that Quebec is already integrated into the Canadian Constitution despite having never formally ratified it (Ottawa Citizen, 9 June 1998). She wrote against the service cuts promulgated by the provincial government of Mike Harris in the mid-1990s (KWS, 11 October 1998), and has written in support of family farms (KWS, 15 December 1998).

Forsey joined the Progressive Conservative Party of Canada in 1998 to support David Orchard's bid for the party leadership. She praised Orchard's "progressive nationalism", though she acknowledged that it was difficult for her to join a party she had long opposed (Ottawa Citizen, 11 September 1998). In 2001, she organized an agricultural forum at the People's Summit of the Americas in Quebec City.

She received 9,604 votes (16.15%) in 2006 as a New Democrat, finishing third against Conservative incumbent Scott Reid.

Mississauga South: Mark de Pelham

De Pelham (born 1980 in Montreal) holds a Bachelor of Arts degree in political science from the University of Northern British Columbia. He helped found the campus and community radio station CFUR in Prince George, and has been involved with the Canadian Federation of Students. He ran for the Marijuana Party in 2004 against Conservative leader Stephen Harper. During the 2006 election, he was listed as a customer service representative for a heating products company. In the 2006 Ontario municipal elections, he sought office as a school trustee, representing electors to the French-language public Conseil scolaire de district du Centre-Sud-Ouest from Peel Region, but he was not elected.

Ottawa South: Henri Sader
Henri M. Sader is a long-time member of the New Democratic Party in Ottawa, and was its candidate for Ottawa South in the 39th Canadian federal election. He was born and raised in war-torn Lebanon. His mother was Hungarian.

Sader was educated at the College Notre Dame de Jamhour, and at St. Joseph University in Beirut and earned his PhD in economics from the Sorbonne University in Paris, France, in 1980. Sader emigrated to Canada in 1982 and first settled in Toronto. In 1986, he moved to Montreal to work with Carrefour des Cèdres, a non-governmental organization which promotes socio-economic development. In Montreal, he lectured at Concordia University, worked as an economist and researcher for the Jesuit Centre for Social Analysis, and wrote for the magazine Relations, which comments on politics, religion and society from a social justice point of view.

Since 1990, Sader has been active in the New Democratic Party at both the local and national level. He campaigned in many elections for Elisabeth Arnold, Marion Dewar, Evelyn Gigantes, Jamey Heath, John Rodriguez and Lorne Nystrom. In addition, over the last 15 years, he worked as a researcher, executive and legislative assistant for several NDP Members of Parliament – including John Rodriguez (Nickel Belt, Ontario; 1972 1980; 1984–1993), Lorne Nystrom (Yorkton—Melville, Saskatchewan; 1968–1993; 1997–2004) and Peter Julian (Burnaby—New Westminster, British Columbia; since 2004).

During his time on Parliament Hill, Sader played a key role in helping the House of Commons to pass an NDP motion on the so-called "Tobin tax", making Canada the first legislature in the world to do so. Nobel Prize Laureat James Tobin developed the "Tobin tax", which proposes to tax on cross-border currency transactions to reduce economically harmful currency speculation, stabilize the global economy and currency system, and raise revenues for cash-strapped governments around the world. Sader promoted "practical economics" for ordinary consumers and citizens as a contributing editor of Lorne Nystrom's 1999 book, Just Making Change, which makes sense of complex financial issues.

He is currently steward of the CULR-Local 1 (CEP; the Labour College union) and an active member of Local 232 of the Communications, Energy and Paperworkers Union.

He defeated Sandra Griffith-Bonaparte for the New Democratic Party nomination in the riding of Ottawa South for the 39th Canadian federal election, on November 10, 2005.

Sader is fluent in English, French and Arabic. He lives in the Heron Park area of Ottawa South with his wife Mona and their son, Michel.

Ottawa West—Nepean: Marlene Rivier

Rivier has a Master of Arts degree in Psychology from Carleton University in Ottawa, and has been a member of the College of Psychologists of Ontario since the early 1980s. She is a teacher and health care worker, and has worked at the Royal Ottawa Mental Health Centre for more than twenty years.

Rivier is president of Ontario Public Service Employees Union (OPSEU) Local 479, and has been a prominent critic of "private-public partnerships" in provincial health-care delivery. She has criticized both the Ernie Eves and Dalton McGuinty governments for permitting such arrangements, which she describes as "a seductive means of hiding government debt".

Peterborough: Linda Slavin
Linda Slavin was born in 1944 in Vancouver, British Columbia, where her father was stationed with the Royal Canadian Air Force during World War II. The family returned to their home in Peterborough after the war. Slavin has degrees in English and Political Science from Victoria College at the University of Toronto and trained as a teacher at Toronto's College of Education. She was for many years an actor and director at the Peterborough Theatre Guild.

Slavin is a veteran educator and activist in Peterborough. She was awarded a Development Education Award in 1992 for her field mission work in Guatemala, El Salvador, and Nicaragua. In the same period, she helped develop a junior high school course addressing themes of poverty, the environment and international development. She later worked through the International Program at Trent University to target water pollution at Lago San Pablo in Ecuador and the Rio Texcoco in Mexico. She opposed Canada's military intervention in Afghanistan in 2001 and later opposed the 2003 invasion of Iraq. She was granted Trent University's Eminent Service Award in 2003.

Slavin is general manager of the Community Opportunity and Innovation Network (Peterborough) Inc. as of 2010. She has chaired the Peterborough Coalition for Social Justice and is a member of the Raging Grannies.

She is a frequent candidate for public office, having campaigned in several federal, provincial, and municipal elections. In 2004, she defeated five other candidates in a surprise first-round ballot victory for the Peterborough NDP's federal nomination. The following year, she won the party's nomination for the next election without opposition. She later ran for mayor of Peterborough in the 2006 municipal election.

St. Catharines: Jeff Burch

Burch holds a Bachelor of Arts degree from Brock University, and later became a graduate student at the same university. He left in 1996, when he was elected as president of the United Steelworkers local. Since 1999, Burch has been a representative and negotiator for the Service Employees International Union in Toronto and Niagara. He has also been a police officer, and has campaigned for public health services in St. Catharines.

He has campaigned provincially for the New Democratic Party of Ontario, and ran municipally in 1997.

He was elected to St. Catharines City Council in the 2006 St. Catharines municipal election.

St. Paul's: Paul Summerville

Paul Summerville is an economist who has held high positions in several prominent banks, including chief economist for RBC Dominion Securities. Summerville ran in the Toronto riding of St. Paul's. He placed third after Liberal incumbent Carolyn Bennett and Conservative Peter Kent. His campaign increased NDP vote to the highest level in the history of the riding.

Summerville's candidacy was controversial within the party; some believed that his history with large banks was contrary to the NDP's core leftist values, while others believed that he would help rid the party of its image of being financially irresponsible. Most agreed, however, that his twinning of 'prosperity and justice' was a reformulation of long-term party values that have helped position the NDP to take power. It is no coincidence that the issue of fiscal responsibility never came up as an issue for the NDP in the election but in fact was a key criticism of the Conservative Party's platform. More than once on national television Summerville promised that it would be the NDP that would 'keep on eye' on the Conservatives in order to alert the country to a risk of a Conservative Party federal fiscal deficit.

Summerville is the great-nephew of former Toronto mayor Donald Dean Summerville.

Simcoe—Grey: Katy Austin

Katy T. Austin was born on April 14, 1948, at Port Dalhousie, Ontario (now part of St. Catharines). She was raised in Barrie, and received a Bachelor of Physical and Health Education degree from the University of Windsor in 1971. She worked as a teacher after her graduation, joining the Simcoe County district school board in 1975. Austin is also a folk singer, and has performed in coffeehouses.

She has supported the New Democratic Party for many years, and in 1985 was the campaign manager of provincial candidate Paul Wessenger. She received 6,784 votes (11.20%) in 2006, finishing third against Conservative incumbent Helena Guergis.

She will be the NDP's candidate once again in 2008.

Sudbury: Gerry McIntaggart

Gerry McIntaggart was an employee at Inco in Sudbury from 1966 to 2000, working in purchasing and warehousing and as a consultant in Occupational Health and Safety.  He served on the Sudbury City Council and Regional Council from 1991 to 2000, and on the Greater Sudbury City Council from 2000 to 2003.

McIntaggart chaired Sudbury's Health and Social Services Committee and the Sudbury and District Health Unit in the late 1990s and early 2000s.  He was a frequent advocate for improved health spending, and he helped enact a ban on smoking in public places.  He called for a plan against child poverty in 1999, and endorsed a filtration upgrade for Sudbury's drinking water to address safety concerns in the city's south-end.  He was appointed to the board of Greater Sudbury Utilities in April 2001.

In June 2000, McIntaggart introduced a strongly worded motion that criticized the provincial government of Mike Harris for its failure to reappoint Gerry Lougheed Jr. to the board of directors of Cancer Care Ontario.  The motion, which also commended Lougheed for his advocacy of patient rights in Northern Ontario, was approved by city council.  McIntaggart later criticized the provincial government's welfare policies, describing their provision for lifetime bans as unjust.

McIntaggart was appointed vice-chair of Great Sudbury's priorities committee in December 2002, and was re-appointed as Health Unit chair the following month.  He was defeated in his bid for re-election in 2003 and later indicated that his anti-smoking stance was at least partly to blame for the result.

McIntaggart subsequently ran for the New Democratic Party in the 2004 and 2006 federal elections.  On both occasions, he finished second to incumbent Liberal Diane Marleau. He was renominated again as the party's candidate in the next election, but stepped down, citing the desire to spend more time with his family, in July 2008.

McIntaggart was also elected to the Sudbury City Council in 1991, 1994 and 1997.

Thornhill: Simon Strelchik

A resident of Thornhill for almost 20 years, Simon Strelchik says he is a founding member and director of Free the Children, now the largest youth-led humanitarian organization in the world, with over one million participants in 45 countries. The organization has built 400 schools and shipped 200,000 school and health kits to children in need. 

In the recent election, Simon Strelchik achieved a vote increase of 25%, to 4405 votes, against Liberal Susan Kadis and Conservative Anthony Reale.

Simon Strelchik was an original member of the York Region No-smoking Bylaw Task Force, which drafted the law governing tobacco in Thornhill and its surrounding municipalities. Strelchik was also the chief organizer of the 30 Hour Famine in his community for three years, raising money to battle hunger in developing countries.

Strelchik is a past chair of the York Region Health Services Youth Advisory Board, and past member of Vaughan Council's Youth Advisory Committee. Strelchik was also an organizer of the "Truth About Youth" conference and the "Smoke This..." conference, and the executive director of Youth Fighting Tobacco.

Simon Strelchik also sought public office in 2000, 2005 and 2006 to represent Thornhill as a School Trustee on the York Region District School Board.

He has been president of the Thornhill NDP riding association since 2001, and is a past campaign manager.

Whitby—Ajax: Maret Sadem-Thompson

Sadem-Thompson was born in England, and came to Canada in 1958. She holds a Master of Education degree, works an elementary school principal, and has served as president of the Federation of Women Teachers Associations of Ontario, representing 48,000 educators. She has served on the board of the Durham Children's Aid Society and the Ontario Association of Children's Aid Societies. Sadem-Thompson was a vocal opponent of the Mike Harris government's education policies in the late 1990s (Windsor Star, 19 August 1998), but nonetheless took her union out of the 1997 Ontario teacher's strike while other unions were still participating (Saskatoon Star-Phoenix, 8 November 1997). She was fifty-one years old in 2006 (Toronto Star, 24 January 2006).

Manitoba

Niki Ashton (Churchill)
Ashton was defeated by the Liberal candidate, Tina Keeper, partly due to vote splitting with former NDP Member of Parliament Bev Desjarlais. However, she defeated Keeper in the 2008 election.

Dennis Kshyk (Charleswood—St. James—Assiniboia)

Kshyk was born in Two Hills, Alberta and educated at the Northern Alberta Institute of Technology. He joined the Workers Compensation Board of Manitoba in 1991, and was still employed there as of the 2006 election. He has also served with the Residential Tenancy Appeal Commission, and has been chief shop steward of Canadian Union of Public Employees (CUPE) Local 1063.

Kshyk campaigned for the New Democratic Party of Manitoba in the 1999 and 2003 provincial election, and finished a respectable second against Progressive Conservative Party leader Stuart Murray on the latter occasion. He first campaigned for the federal New Democratic Party in the 2000 election, and finished fourth against Liberal incumbent John Harvard. In 2006, he finished third against Conservative Steven Fletcher.

Bill Blaikie (Elmwood—Transcona)

Blaikie was re-elected to a ninth term in parliament, receiving 16,967 votes (50.85%) in his riding.

Darren Van Den Bussche (Portage—Lisgar)

Van Den Bussche was born and raised in the Portage—Lisgar area, and is now a full-time firefighter in Portage la Prairie. He is also a certified medical technician, and once worked for a privately funded ambulance service. Partly as a result of this experience, he is now a committed supporter of public health delivery, and has been quoted as saying, "I’ve seen what can happen with private service because they’re there for profit and have to answer to their shareholders".

Active in the labour movement, Van Den Bussche has been area vice-president of the Manitoba Federation of Labour, and president of the Portage Labour Council. He is also a founder and coach of Portage Youth Scrimmage Hockey.

He first campaigned for the NDP in the 2004 election, after defeating two other candidates to win the party's Portage—Lisgar nomination. He spoke out against the North American Free Trade Agreement (NAFTA) and western alienation (Winnipeg Free Press, 22 June 2004), and finished third against Conservative Brian Pallister. He achieved the same result in 2006.

Patrick O'Connor (Provencher)

O'Connor was educated at the University of Manitoba, studying Mathematics and Physics. He worked as a computer programmer in the university's Physics (Cyclotron) Department for six years, and was an employee of Atomic Energy of Canada Ltd. (AECL) from 1975 to 1998, specializing in nuclear waste research.

In 1997, O'Connor made ambivalent comments about the AECL's proposal to store nuclear waste in the Canadian Shield. He argued that the plan was technologically possible, but was skeptical of whether it would be properly funded by the government (Winnipeg Free Press, 28 January 1997).

Stationed at Pinawa during his career with AECL, O'Connor has been president of the Provencher NDP association for most of the period since 1975. He served on the executive of the Beausejour Consumers' Co-op between 1980 and 1988, and was its president from 1983. He received 5,259 votes (13.71%) in 2006, finishing second against Conservative incumbent Vic Toews.

Mathieu Allard (St. Boniface)

Mathieu Allard (born in St. Boniface, Manitoba) is a young politician in Manitoba, Canada. He was the New Democratic Party candidate for the riding of St. Boniface in the 2004 and 2006 elections.

Allard has a Bachelor of Arts degree in Political Science and Sociology from the Collège universitaire de Saint-Boniface. During the 2004 election, he was working towards completion of a master's degree in public administration at the University of Manitoba. He was also a weight-lifter at the 1999 Canada Winter Games, and trained for two years as a boxer. He received 9,311 votes or 21.9% in the 2006 federal election.

Robert Page (Winnipeg South)

Page holds Bachelor of Arts and Bachelor of Education degrees, as well as a Master of Arts degree from the University of Manitoba in outdoor education. He works as a teacher, and is a member of Canadian Parents for French (Immersion) and the Winnipeg Canoe Club. He was a grandfather at the time of the election.

Page was elected as a school trustee for the Seine River Division in 2002 (Winnipeg Free Press, 12 November 2002), and unsuccessfully campaigned for a St. Norbert council seat in early 2005. He spoke out against the construction of "cookie-cutter" suburbs in the latter campaign, and supported rapid transit expansion (WFP, 29 March and 12 April 2005). He resigned from the Seine River School Division on October 31, 2005, presumably in order to prepare for the upcoming federal election.

He received 5,743 votes (13.73%) in 2006, placing third against Conservative candidate Rod Bruinooge.

Alberta

Holly Heffernan (Calgary Southwest)

Heffernan is a registered nurse, and was listed as 48 years old in 2004. She graduated from the Foothills School of Nursing in 1976, and received a Bachelor of Nursing degree from the University of Calgary in 1993. She was a board member with the United Nurses of Alberta for more than twelve years, and served on the Alberta Federation of Labour Occupational Health and Safety Committee in 2002. As of 2004, she worked at Rockyview Hospital in Outpatient Urology and served as a relief nurse in the G.I. unit. Heffernan is a member of Christ Moravian Church.

Heffernan campaigned for the Alberta New Democratic Party in 2004. Her 2006 campaign was primarily focused against privatization in the health-care sector (Canadian Press, 25 December 2005), and she was endorsed by the Calgary and District Labour Council (Calgary Herald, 21 January 2006).

Teale Phelps Bondaroff (Calgary West)
Born February, 1986, in Calgary, Alberta. He was a student at the University of Calgary, pursuing a double degree in political science and international relations.

Awards:
The University of Calgary's Chancellor's Scholarship, a four-year award given to the top six entrance students annually.
A Millennium Scholarship.
The Premier's Citizenship Award.
Award for Outstanding Volunteer Service for his work to expand and beautify urban green spaces.

Community Activities
Social Sciences Faculty Representative on the University of Calgary Students Union.
Active in numerous clubs on campus, holding executive positions in the Speech and Debate Society, the Model United Nations Team and the Political Science Students Association.
Volunteer with many groups, including the Hull Child and Family Services, Calgary's Arts and the Environment, Forever Green, the Kensington BRZ, and the Calgary United Nations Society.
Represented Calgary at the Global Young Leaders Conference in Washington and New York in 2003.

British Columbia
Barry Bell (Fleetwood—Port Kells)
Mike Bocking (Pitt Meadows—Maple Ridge—Mission)
Alice Brown (Okanagan—Shuswap)
Brent Bush (Kootenay—Columbia)
Angel Claypool (Langley)
Nancy Clegg (Newton—North Delta)
Rebecca Coad (Vancouver Quadra)
Michael Crawford (Kamloops—Thompson—Cariboo)
Malcolm Crockett (Prince George—Peace River)
Kevin Hagglund (Kelowna—Lake Country)
John Harrop (Okanagan—Coquihalla)
Jeffrey Hansen-Carlson (Abbotsford)
Malcolm James (Chilliwack—Fraser Canyon)
William Jonsson (Delta—Richmond East)
Bev Meslo (Vancouver South)
Neil Smith (Richmond)
Libby Thornton (South Surrey—White Rock—Cloverdale)
Alfred Trudeau (Cariboo—Prince George)

References